Arnautovići is a village in the municipality of Visoko, Bosnia and Herzegovina.

It is the location of Mile burial place of Bosnian kings.

Demographics 
According to the 2013 census, its population was 466.

References

Populated places in Visoko